The biennial Charlotte mayoral election was held on Tuesday, November 5, 2013. Primary elections were held on Tuesday, September 10, 2013. Unaffiliated voters were allowed to vote in either the Democratic or Republican primary.

On July 2, 2013, Anthony Foxx, a Democrat, announced that he would resign as mayor to become United States Secretary of Transportation. District 1 city councilperson Patsy Kinsey, also a Democrat, was named interim mayor the same day with the understanding that she would not stand in the mayoral election in November. Kinsey instead ran to regain the council seat she had vacated.

Democratic Party nominee Patrick Cannon, another member of the city council, won the general election to become the 55th mayor of Charlotte. However, only under four months into his term, on March 26, 2014, Cannon was arrested by the FBI on charges of accepting bribes (to which he later pleaded guilty) and resigned later that day, prompting the City Council to elect Dan Clodfelter to serve for the remainder of Cannon's term as the 57th Mayor of Charlotte.

Candidates

Democratic
Mayor Pro Tempore/City Council member Patrick Cannon 
Gary Mitchell Dunn 
City Council member James Mitchell, Jr.
Lucille Puckett

Declined
Mayor Anthony Foxx, a Democrat, declined to run for a third term in 2013 and was then appointed United States Secretary of Transportation by President Barack Obama.
Interim Mayor Patsy Kinsey

Republican
Former City Councilman Edwin Peacock III
David Michael Rice

Results

Primaries

General election

References

External links
Mecklenburg County Board of Elections

2013
Charlotte mayoral
Charlotte